Andrew Stetson (born August 24, 1979) is a Canadian model.

Career
Andrew Stetson worked as a carpenter before becoming a fashion model at the age of 23. He was discovered by Norwayne Anderson of the NAM agency.

After a year of modeling in New York and Europe, he returned to renovating homes and started a home renovation business, although his friends and family would later encourage him to return to modeling. He has since walked for many designers and has appeared in numerous ad campaigns for Armani, Chanel, Dolce & Gabbana, Zara, Calvin Klein, Levi's, Bloomingdales, and H&M. He also made the cover of gay French magazine Têtu in November 2005 and again in May 2010, the latter issue devoting six full pages to him. In August 2006, Stetson had signed a three-year contract for Calvin Klein's fragrance, Euphoria. He was succeeded by Carson Parker as the face of Euphoria and Garrett Neff as the spokesmodel for the company.

References 

Canadian male models
Living people
1979 births